Wainuia clarki is a species of air-breathing predatory land snail, a terrestrial pulmonate gastropod mollusc in the family Rhytididae.

Distribution 
This species occurs in New Zealand

Feeding habits 
Wainuia clarki feeds mainly on earthworms.

References

External links 
 Help track secretive snails on Department of Conservation (New Zealand) website

Rhytididae
Gastropods described in 1936
Taxa named by Arthur William Baden Powell
Endemic fauna of New Zealand
Endemic molluscs of New Zealand